Al-Haramain v. Obama, 690 F.3d 1089 (9th Cir. 2012) was a case before the U.S. District Court for the Northern District of California filed 28 February 2006 by the al-Haramain Foundation and its two attorneys concerning the NSA warrantless surveillance controversy. The case withstood retroactive changes brought by the Congressional response to the NSA warrantless surveillance program.

Background
In 2004 during proceedings to freeze al-Haramain Foundation, an Oregon Nonprofit Corporation, the government inadvertently gave the organization classified documents that suggest the foundation was subject to electronic surveillance. Al-Harmain and their two attorneys filed a lawsuit claiming violation of the Foreign Intelligence Surveillance Act via unlawful surveillance, based on the classified documents that the government gave Al-Harmain. The district court found that the Foreign Intelligence Surveillance Act preempted the state secrets privilege and waived sovereign immunity for damages under 50 U.S.C.S. § 1810.

Opinion
On March 31, 2010, Chief Judge Vaughn R. Walker granted partial summary judgment in favor of the plaintiffs, because 50 U.S.C.S. § 1810 has no explicit waiver of sovereign immunity, and on 21 December awarded $2.5 million in attorneys' fees and about $41,000 to two of the three plaintiffs. The court affirm the dismissal of claims against Mueller.

The district court was reversed and the case was subsequently dismissed by Ninth Circuit Court of Appeals on August 7, 2012.

References

External links

2012 in United States case law
United States Court of Appeals for the Ninth Circuit cases
United States privacy case law
Privacy of telecommunications
Sovereign immunity in the United States